The Marrowbone Historic District is a  historic district in Marrowbone, Cumberland County, Kentucky which was listed on the National Register of Historic Places in 1983.  It included three contributing buildings.

It includes the Marrowbone Presbyterian Church, the Modern Woodmen of America Hall, and the William Barton House (with a small smokehouse behind).  The church and probably also the Woodmen Hall were built by local contractor John Wesley Williams.

References

Historic districts on the National Register of Historic Places in Kentucky
Gothic Revival architecture in Kentucky
Buildings and structures completed in 1865
National Register of Historic Places in Cumberland County, Kentucky
1865 establishments in Kentucky